Guangxi Longguida Football Club is an association football club from Guangxi, China. They compete in the China Amateur Football League. The Guangxi Sports Center Stadium, which has a capacity of 60,000, is their home venue.

History
Guangxi Longguida F.C. was established in December 2014. They played in the 2014 China Amateur Football League finished the 4th place and won promotion to 2015 China League Two. After a stellar 2015 season, The club had to sell their Chinese FA registration and entire first-team to Nantong Zhiyun F.C. The following 2016 league campaign saw the club start at the bottom of the Chinese pyramid in the fourth tier with a team assembled from their former reserve squad.

Name history
2014–2015 Guangxi Longguida 广西龙桂达
2016 Guangxi Wodema 广西沃德玛
2017– Guangxi Longguida 广西龙桂达

Managerial history
  Huang Yong (2015)
  Huang Feng (2016)

Results
All-time league rankings

As of the end of 2016 season.

 in group stage.

Key
 Pld = Played
 W = Games won
 D = Games drawn
 L = Games lost
 F = Goals for
 A = Goals against
 Pts = Points
 Pos = Final position

 DNQ = Did Not Qualify
 DNE = Did Not Enter
 NH = Not Held
 – = Does Not Exist
 R1 = Round 1
 R2 = Round 2
 R3 = Round 3
 R4 = Round 4

 F = Final
 SF = Semi-finals
 QF = Quarter-finals
 R16 = Round of 16
 Group = Group stage
 GS2 = Second Group stage
 QR1 = First Qualifying Round
 QR2 = Second Qualifying Round
 QR3 = Third Qualifying Round

References

Football clubs in China
Association football clubs established in 2014
2014 establishments in China
Sport in Guangxi